Henri Skoda (born 1945) is a French mathematician, specializing in the analysis of several complex variables.

Skoda studied from 1964 at l'École normale supérieure and received there in 1967 his agrégation in mathematics. He received in 1972 his Ph.D. from the University of Nice Sophia Antipolis under André Martineau (primary advisor) and Pierre Lelong (secondary advisor) with thesis Étude quantitative des sous-ensembles analytiques de Cn et des idéaux de functions holomorphes. Skoda became a professor in Toulon and since 1976 has been a professor at the University of Paris VI.

For many years he ran an analysis seminar with Pierre Lelong and Pierre Dolbeault.

In 1978 Skoda received the Poncelet Prize and as an invited speaker at the International Congress of Mathematicians in Helsinki gave a talk Integral methods and zeros of holomorphic functions.

His doctoral students include Jean-Pierre Demailly.

Selected publications

with Joël Briançon: 

with J.-P. Demailly:

See also
Briancon–Skoda theorem
Skoda–El Mir theorem

References

External links
Conference in Complex Analysis in honor of Henri Skoda — Paris, september 12–16 2005, Institut Henri Poincaré

École Normale Supérieure alumni
Côte d'Azur University alumni
Academic staff of the University of Paris
20th-century French mathematicians
21st-century French mathematicians
Complex analysts
Mathematical analysts
1945 births
Living people